George Mohn "Doc" Bohler (February 8, 1887 – December 10, 1968) was an American football, basketball, and baseball coach. He served as the head football coach at Mississippi College (1925–1927), Auburn University (1928–1929), and Louisiana Tech University (1930–1933), compiling a career college football record of 34–38–1. Bohler was also the head basketball coach at the University of Oregon (1920–1923), Auburn (1928–1929), and the University of Mississippi (1935–1938), amassing a career college basketball mark of 96–81, and served as the head baseball coach at Oregon (1921–1923), tallying a record of 11–43.

Bohler was born on February 8, 1887. He died in December 1968 and was buried in Arlington National Cemetery. He was a brother of Fred Bohler and Roy Bohler.

Coaching career
From 1928 to 1929, Bohler coached football and basketball at Auburn. He compiled a 3–11 record with the Auburn Tigers football team and a 6–15 record with the basketball team. From 1930 to 1933, Bohler coached football at Louisiana Tech, where he had greater success. He posted a 15–17 record in four seasons. His 1931 team went undefeated at 7–0.

Head coaching record

Football

Notes

References

1887 births
1968 deaths
American men's basketball players
Auburn Tigers football coaches
Auburn Tigers men's basketball coaches
Basketball coaches from Pennsylvania
Basketball players from Pennsylvania
Louisiana Tech Bulldogs football coaches
Mississippi College Choctaws football coaches
Mississippi College Choctaws men's basketball coaches
Ole Miss Rebels football coaches
Ole Miss Rebels men's basketball coaches
Oregon Ducks baseball coaches
Oregon Ducks men's basketball coaches
People from Berks County, Pennsylvania
Sportspeople from the Delaware Valley
Washington State Cougars men's basketball players